The oscillating U-tube is a technique to determine the density of liquids and gases  based on an electronic measurement of the frequency of oscillation, from which the density value is calculated. This measuring principle is based on the Mass-Spring Model.

The sample is filled into a container with oscillation capacity. The eigenfrequency of this container is influenced by the sample's mass. This container with oscillation capacity is a hollow, U-shaped glass tube (oscillating U-tube) which is electronically excited into undamped oscillation. The two branches of the U-shaped oscillator function as its spring elements.

The direction of oscillation is normal to the level of the two branches. The oscillator's eigenfrequency is only influenced by the part of the sample that is actually involved in the oscillation. The volume involved in the oscillation is limited by the stationary oscillation knots at the bearing points of the oscillator. If the oscillator is at least filled up to its bearing points, the same precisely defined volume always participates in the oscillation, thus the measured value of the sample's mass can be used to calculate its density.

Overfilling the oscillator beyond the bearing points is irrelevant to the measurement. For this reason the oscillator can also be employed to measure the density of sample media that flow through the tube (Continuous Measurement).

In modern digital density meters, Piezo elements are used to excite the U-tube  whereby optical pickups determine the period of oscillation. This period τ can be measured with high resolution and stands in simple relation to the density ρ of the sample in the oscillator:

A and B are the respective instrument constants of each oscillator. Their values are determined by calibrating with two substances of the precisely known densities ρ1 and ρ2. Modern instruments calculate and store the constants A and B after the two calibration measurements, which are mostly performed with air and water. They employ suitable measures to compensate various parasitic influences on the measuring result, e.g. the influence of the sample's viscosity and the non-linearity caused by the measuring instrument's finite mass as well as aging effects of the glass (reference oscillator).

In 1967 the company Anton Paar GmbH presented the first digital density meter for liquids and gases employing the oscillating U-tube principle at ACHEMA.

Sources 

 Otto Kratky et al., ''Device for density determination.'' US Patent 3523446, https://patents.google.com/patent/US3523446
Stabinger, Hans: "Density Measurement using modern oscillating transducers", South Yorkshire Trading Standards Unit, Sheffield 1994
 ISO 15212-1

External links
 Anton Paar GmbH
 Dr. Hans Stabinger

Measuring instruments